Harry Field (birth unknown – death unknown), also known by the nickname of "Tupper", was a professional rugby league footballer who played in the 1920s and 1930s.

Background
He gained the nickname "Tupper" because on a tour of Australia he head butted a post and snapped it.

Playing career

International honours
Harry Field won caps for Great Britain while at York in 1936 against Australia, and New Zealand (2 matches).

County honours
Harry Field won cap(s) for Yorkshire while at York.

County Cup Final appearances
Harry Field played  in Wakefield Trinity's 5-5 draw with Leeds in the 1934 Yorkshire County Cup Final during the 1934–35 season at Crown Flatt, Dewsbury on Saturday 27 October 1934, played  in the 2-2 draw with Leeds in the 1934 Yorkshire County Cup Final replay during the 1934–35 season at Fartown Ground, Huddersfield on Wednesday 31 October 1934, played  in the 0-13 defeat by Leeds in the 1934 Yorkshire County Cup Final second replay during the 1934–35 season at Parkside, Hunslet on Wednesday 7 November 1934, and played  in York's 9-2 victory over Wakefield Trinity in the 1936 Yorkshire County Cup Final during the 1936–37 season at Headingley Rugby Stadium, Leeds on Saturday 17 October 1936.

Notable tour matches
Harry Field played  in Wakefield Trinity's 6-17 defeat by Australia in the 1933–34 Kangaroo tour of Great Britain match during the 1933–34 season at  Belle Vue, Wakefield on Saturday 28 October 1933.

Club career

References

External links
!Great Britain Statistics at englandrl.co.uk (statistics currently missing due to not having appeared for both Great Britain, and England)

English rugby league players
Great Britain national rugby league team players
Place of birth missing
Place of death missing
Rugby league hookers
Rugby league props
Wakefield Trinity players
Year of death missing
York Wasps players
Yorkshire rugby league team players
1909 births